Faveria leucophaeella is a species of snout moth in the genus Faveria. It was described by Philipp Christoph Zeller in 1867. It is found in South Africa, Australia, Japan, Taiwan and China.

References

Moths described in 1867
Phycitini
Moths of Africa
Moths of Asia
Moths of Australia